Rhynchochydorus australiensis is a species of crustacean in the family Chydoridae. It is the only species in the genus Rhynchochydorus. It is endemic to Australia.

Sources

Cladocera
Branchiopoda genera
Freshwater crustaceans of Australia
Vulnerable fauna of Australia
Monotypic arthropod genera
Taxonomy articles created by Polbot